Khazanchi (English: Cashier) is a 1941 (pre-partition) blockbuster, directed by Moti B. Gidwani, starring M. Ismail, S. D. Narang, Ramola Devi, Manorama and Durga Mota in lead roles. M. Ismail played the title role of a Khazanchi (English: Cashier). The movie was the biggest hit and the top earner of 1941. The film was remade in Tamil as Moondru Pillaigal (1952).

Synopsis 
Khazanchi is a murder mystery. Shadi Lal is a Khazanchi (English: Cashier) in a bank in Lahore. His son Kanwal wants to marry Madhuri, the daughter of a rich man, Durga Das.

A wicked wealthy, Ajmal, also wants to marry Madhuri. One day, Shadi Lal goes to Bombay for some bank work and the news comes from the city that Shadi Lal has murdered an actress and stolen her jewellery and money.

A clever woman, Tarawati, tricked Shadi Lal in a night club and stole his money, but her two accomplice men murdered her while snatching the money from her and when intoxicated Shadi Lal wakes up, he finds himself with her dead body and his money stolen. Seeing this, he runs away and on the next day, the newspaper headlines say: Khazanchi killed actress. He spends some very bad days of his life during this period.

Later, he gets caught and his son, Kanwal (an advocate now), fought the case from his side. Meanwhile, the newspaper reporter stumbles upon important facts regarding the stage actress' murder and got kidnapped by the villain, but manages an escape and reaches the court, revealing the truth. Thus Shadi Lal gets acquitted.

Cast 

 Ramola as Madhuri
 S. D. Narang as Kanwal
 M.Esmail as Shadilal
 Manorma as Asha, Shadi Lal's daughter and Kanwal's sister
 Madan Puri as dancer on stage
 Janki Dass M.A. as Ram Das
 Ajmal as Ramesh
 Durga Mota as Durga Das
 Nafees
 Kamla
 Fazal Shah
 Dev Datt
 Khairati as servant in Durga Mota house

Music 
The music director Ghulam Haider made an experiment by combining popular Raags of Indian classical music with Punjabi folk music and revolutionalized the film music industry. The film songs were hits. The playback includes Shamshad Begum, Noor Jehan and more.

See also 
 Gul-E-Bakawali (film)

References

External links 

 Khazanchi (1941) on indiancine.ma

1941 films
Indian black-and-white films
Punjabi-language Indian films
Punjabi-language Pakistani films
Hindi films remade in other languages
Indian mystery films
1941 mystery films